The Incredible Mrs. Ritchie is a 2003 Canadian made-for-television drama film directed by Paul Johansson. It premiered on Showtime on July 12, 2003.

Cast
 Gena Rowlands as Evelyn Ritchie
 Kevin Zegers as Charlie Proud
 Leslie Hope as Joan Proud
 David Schofield as Sonny Proud
 Cameron Daddo as Jim 
 James Caan as Harry Dewitt
 Justin Chatwin as Lawrence
 Anna Van Hooft as Samantha
 Paul Johansson as Jack
 Brenda James as Virginia
 Jeremy Raymond as Stanley

Release
The film premiered on Showtime on July 12, 2003, followed by a DVD release in the U.S. on March 30, 2004.

Awards and nominations

External links
 

2003 television films
2003 drama films
English-language Canadian films
Showtime (TV network) films
2003 films
Canadian drama television films
2000s Canadian films